Villa Dique Florentino Ameghino  is a rural commune in Chubut Province in southern Argentina.  It is located next to the Florentino Ameghino Dam on the Chubut River,  to the west of the city of Trelew.  The town had 224 residents as of the 2001 census, an 18.5% increase from the previous (1991) census, when it had 189 residents.

References

External links
 Official site 
 Page at provincial government website 

Populated places in Chubut Province